The Heinkel He 63 was a trainer biplane built in Germany in the early 1930s. It was a largely conventional design with single-bay wings, fixed tailskid undercarriage, and two open cockpits in tandem. An unusual feature of the design was the highly swept, arrow-shaped upper wing, braced to the lower wing by N-type struts. Prototypes of the He 63 were built in both landplane and seaplane form, but no production ensued.

Specifications (Landplane)

References
 
 

1930s German civil trainer aircraft
He 063